The Dresdner Philharmonie (Dresden Philharmonic) is a German symphony orchestra based in Dresden.  Its principal concert venue is the Kulturpalast.  The orchestra also performs at the Kreuzkirche, the Hochschule für Musik Dresden, and the Schloss Albrechtsberg.  It receives financial support from the city of Dresden.  The choral ensembles affiliated with the orchestra are the Dresden Philharmonic Choir and Dresden Philharmonic Chamber Choir.

History
The orchestra was founded in 1870 and gave its first concert in the Gewerbehaussaal on 29 November 1870, under the name Gewerbehausorchester.  The orchestra acquired its current name in 1915.  During the existence of the DDR, the orchestra took up its primary residence in the Kulturpalast.  After German reunification, plans had been proposed for a new concert hall.  These had not come to fruition by the time of the principal conductorship of Marek Janowski, who cited this lack of development of a new hall for the orchestra as the reason for his resignation from the post in 2003.  

The orchestra's current principal conductor is Michael Sanderling, since 2011.  His initial contract was for three years.  In October 2013, the orchestra announced the extension of Sanderling's contract as principal conductor through the 2018–2019 season.  In November 2016, Sanderling announced, via a letter to the mayor of Dresden, his intention to stand down as chief conductor of the orchestra after the end of his current contract in 2019, in protest at learning of proposed culture budget reductions via media reports instead of being informed directly from the civic authorities.

In September 2018, the orchestra announced the re-appointment of Janowski as its chief conductor, effective with the 2019–2020 season, with an initial contract of three seasons.  In November 2020, the orchestra announced the extension of Janowski's contract as chief conductor by one season, through the summer of 2023.  The current Intendantin of the orchestra is Frauke Roth, in the post since 2015, and currently under contract to the orchestra through 2026.

Principal conductors

 Hermann Mannsfeldt (1870–1885)
 Michael Zimmermann (1885–1886)
 Ernst Stahl (1886–1890)
 August Trenkler (1890–1903)
 Willy Olsen (1903–1915)
 Edwin Lindner (1915–1923)
 Joseph Gustav Mraczek (1923–1924)
 Eduard Mörike (1924–1929)
 Paul Scheinpflug (1929–1932)
 Werner Ladwig (1932–1934)
 Paul van Kempen (1934–1942)
 Carl Schuricht (1942–1944)
 Gerhart Wiesenhütter (1945–1946)
 Heinz Bongartz (1947–1964)
 Horst Förster (1964–1967)
 Kurt Masur (1967–1972)
 Günther Herbig (1972–1976)
 Herbert Kegel (1977–1985)
 Jörg-Peter Weigle (1986–1994)
 Michel Plasson (1994–2001)
 Marek Janowski (2001–2003)
 Rafael Frühbeck de Burgos (2004–2011)
 Michael Sanderling (2011–2019)
 Marek Janowski (2019–present)

In popular culture
The symphony orchestra appears in the 2022 film, Tár.

References

External links
 Dresdner Philharmonie and Philharmoniker official website
 CDs of Dresdner Philharmonie released by label GENUIN
 Bach Cantatas page profile of the orchestra

German symphony orchestras
Music in Dresden
Musical groups established in 1870
1870 establishments in Saxony